In the 1997 Cameroonian Premier League season, 18 teams competed. Cotonsport Garoua won the championship.

Teams 

Relegated teams
 Océan Kribi
 Olympic Maroua

Promoted teams
 Olympic Mvolyé
 Avenir Douala
 Victoria United
 Union Abong-Mbang

League table

References
Cameroon - List of final tables (RSSSF)

Cam
Cam
1
Elite One seasons